The Threefold Lotus Sutra (法華三部経 pinyin: fǎ huá sān bù jīng, Jp: Hokke-sambu-kyo) is the composition of three complementary sutras that together form the "three-part Dharma flower sutra":

1. The Innumerable Meanings Sutra (無量義經 Ch: Wú Liáng Yì Jīng, Jp: Muryōgi Kyō), prologue to the Lotus Sutra.
2. The Lotus Sutra  (妙法蓮華經 Ch: Miào Fǎ Lián Huá Jīng, Jp: Myōhō Renge Kyō) itself.
3. The Sutra of Meditation on the Bodhisattva Universal Virtue/Samantabhadra Meditation Sutra (普賢經 Ch: Pǔ Xián Jīng, Jp: Fugen Kyō), epilogue to the Lotus Sutra.

They have been known collectively as the Threefold Lotus Sutra in China and Japan since ancient times.

Notes

References 
  
 
 
 
 

Mahayana sutras
Mahayana texts
Nichiren Buddhism